Józef Machnik (29 August 1931 – 15 June 1990) was a Polish footballer. He played in two matches for the Poland national football team in 1956.

References

External links
 

1931 births
1990 deaths
Polish footballers
Poland international footballers
Place of birth missing
Association footballers not categorized by position